Galēni Parish is an administrative unit of Preiļi Municipality in the Latgale region of Latvia. At the beginning of 2014, the population of the parish was 890. The administrative center is Galēni village.

Towns, villages and settlements of Galēni parish 
 Galēni
 Gribolva
 Indāni
 Lomi-Bortnieki
 Maltas Trūpi
 Voveres

References

External links 
 

Parishes of Latvia
Preiļi Municipality
Latgale